Auckland Institute and Museum, known as Auckland Museum Institute since 1996 and the Royal Society of New Zealand Auckland Branch, is a learned society in New Zealand.

History
Formed as the Auckland Philosophical Society on 6 November 1867, for "the promotion of art, science, and literature by means of a museum and library, lectures, and meetings of the members", with a view to incorporation with the newly created New Zealand Institute and adopting the Auckland Museum, the Society was fittingly renamed the Auckland Institute in March 1868 and formally incorporated with the New Zealand Institute on 10 June 1868.

In October 1869, upon the resolution of the Auckland Provincial Council, John Williamson, Superintendent of the Province of Auckland, transferred the 17-year-old Auckland Museum and its contents to the Auckland Institute, on the guarantee that the Institute "will adopt the proper measures (1) for the preservation of its present contents, (2) for a free admission of the public at convenient times." He also obtained a grant of the old Post Office site in Princes Street for the Institute. By 1871 the Institute was known as Auckland Institute and Museum; which first appeared on their annual reports in 1880–81.

Following World War I, the Auckland War Memorial Museum was opened (1929) and joined with the Institute.

In 1996 the Auckland War Memorial Museum Act 1996 separated the Institute from governance of the War Memorial Museum. Today the Auckland Museum Institute is charged with the support of the Museum and Museum Trust Board by providing advocacy, promoting the use and understanding of the Museum's collections and activities and supporting the function of the War Memorial aspect of the Museum. Since 1996, it has focused on its historic roles as 'Learned Society', operating Friends of the Auckland Museum, and appointing body for four Museum Trust Board members.

Sections
The Institute's first independent special interest group, the Medical Section for the promotion of medical science, formed in 1869. The Anthroplogy and Maori Studies Section followed in 1922; Astronomical Section, Auckland Astronomical Society, in 1923–24; and Maritime Section, Auckland Maritime Society, in 1958. Auckland Astronomical Society pursued the establishment of Stardome Observatory. Auckland Maritime Society pursued the establishment of the New Zealand Maritime Museum.

Current sections are:
 Conchology Section: Auckland Shell Club, from 1931
 Costume & Textile Section: Costume and Textile Association of New Zealand, from 2002

Networks
Auckland Museum Institute is a partner in the Monuments Men and Women Museum Network, launched in 2021 by the Monuments Men Foundation for the Preservation of Art.

Publications

See also
 Royal Society of New Zealand
 Auckland War Memorial Museum
 Monuments Men Foundation for the Preservation of Art

References

1867 establishments in New Zealand
Auckland War Memorial Museum
Royal Society of New Zealand
Learned societies of New Zealand
Science and technology in New Zealand